CoastCon is Mississippi's longest running and largest science fiction, fantasy and gaming convention. It is the main sponsored event of CoastCon, Inc., a non-profit literary organization. CoastCon, Inc. and its ten-member volunteer board develop events and gatherings to promote reading, education, fellowship, and science fiction, fantasy and gaming in all formats across the Southern United States, for over forty years.  The next CoastCon annual convention, CoastCon 45, will be held March 3-5, 2023, at the Mississippi Coast Coliseum and Convention Center in Biloxi, Mississippi.

Events
Besides the largest genre-themed vendor's room in the state, the art show and auction, a charity auction, and Saturday costume contest and evening dance party, each year members and attendees of CoastCon can participate in three days of events including over 72 hours of panels, seminars, demonstrations, and workshops on topics that include activities on  writing, art, anime, gaming, science fiction and fantasy literature, comic books, costuming, hard science, online media, fandom, genre film and television, table-top, card and miniatures gaming, robotics, and filk, to name only a few.

Guests
CoastCon brings guests to its convention each year. CoastCon past guests include stars of many areas of interest to fandom. A short list of past guests include (in no particular order): actress Nicki Clyne, author David Drake, author David Weber, artist John Picacio, actress Virginia Hey, actress Gigi Edgley, actor Peter Mayhew, game designer Mike Mearls, author Michael Moorcock, actor Peter Jurasik, actor/producer James Cawley, author Deborah LeBlanc, author Sharon Green, actress Noel Neill, and game designer Dave Arneson.

Charity
Each year the convention's parent organization chooses to support a charity that aligns with the convention's goals. For 2016 CoastCon Inc. has chosen the Pink Heart Funds as its main charity.

References

External links
 CoastCon's official website
 CoastCon's Facebook page
 Quality Inn  CoastCon's host hotel http://www.qualityinn.com/hotel-biloxi-mississippi-MS200

Multigenre conventions
Recurring events established in 1977
Biloxi, Mississippi
Tourist attractions in Harrison County, Mississippi
Mississippi culture